The 2007 Toronto Argonauts season was the 50th season for the team in the Canadian Football League and 135th season overall. The Argonauts finished the regular season 11–7 and finished in first place in the East Division.

Offseason

CFL draft

Preseason

Regular season

The team began with a disappointing 2-6 start to the season. With playoff hopes in jeopardy following a last second loss to the Blue Bombers on August 24th, the team turned things around with two big wins against their rivals from Hamilton. Pinball led the group to a 9-1 finish and a sixth straight playoff appearance.

Season standings

Season schedule

Postseason

The Winnipeg Blue Bombers advanced to the Grey Cup for the first time in six years by stunning the Toronto Argonauts on Sunday but lost star quarterback, Kevin Glenn in the process.

Awards and records
 Jonathan Brown, DE, James P. McCaffrey Trophy

CFL Eastern All-Stars: OFFENCE
 OG – Taylor Robertson, Toronto Argonauts

CFL Eastern All-Stars: DEFENCE
 DE – Jonathan Brown, Toronto Argonauts
 LB – Kevin Eiben, Toronto Argonauts
 DB – Kenny Wheaton, Toronto Argonauts
 CB – Byron Parker, Toronto Argonauts
 CB – Jordan Younger, Toronto Argonauts
 DS – Orlondo Steinauer, Toronto Argonauts

References

Toronto Argonauts
Toronto Argonauts seasons